Eddie Carroll (September 5, 1933 – April 6, 2010) was a Canadian actor, who is best known as the third performer to provide the voice for Jiminy Cricket, a role he played for over 35 years.

Career
In Canada, Carroll studied at the Orion theater with fellow student Robert Goulet. After moving to Hollywood in 1956 to work for NBC as a writer and producer, living as a resident alien in the United States, he was drafted into the US Army. He performed with the Armed Forces Radio Service and the 6th Army Chorus. In 1959, he took the professional name Eddie Carroll. In 1960 Carroll released a comedy album, "On Fraternity Row." In 1962, he co-wrote the song "How Is Julie?" which was recorded by The Lettermen. Starting in the early 1960s, Carroll appeared in numerous television programs and commercials. In 1970, he and business partner Jamie Farr developed and syndicated a sports-talk program, "Man to Man", through MGM Television, and not long after a Saturday morning animated series for Hanna-Barbera, The Amazing Chan and the Chan Clan.

Carroll took over the role of Jiminy Cricket for Walt Disney Productions in 1973 after the death of original voice actor Cliff Edwards in 1971, and a brief stint by Clarence Nash. From 1983 until his death in 2010, he traveled with two one-man shows portraying comedian Jack Benny: "A Small Eternity with Jack Benny" and "Jack Benny: Laughter in Bloom." From 1995 to 1996, Carroll toured with a production of The Odd Couple. In later years, he attended numerous conventions and gatherings for both Disney fans and devotees of old-time radio.

Eddie Carroll was sometimes billed as Eddy Carroll. He is not to be confused with British big band musician Eddie Carroll.

Personal life and death
Carroll married his wife Carolyn Springer on April 7, 1963; together they had two children, Tina and Leland.

On April 6, 2010, Carroll died from a brain tumor at the Motion Picture & Television Country House and Hospital in Woodland Hills, California, at the age of 76, just one day before his 47th wedding anniversary.

Filmography

Television

Films

Video games

References

External links

 
 Eddie Carroll on Facebook
 The Radio Dan Show Interview
 

1933 births
2010 deaths
Canadian expatriate male actors in the United States
Canadian male video game actors
Canadian male voice actors
Canadian people of Ukrainian descent
Deaths from brain cancer in the United States
Male actors from Alberta
People from Smoky Lake County